These Friends of Mine may refer to:

 These Friends of Mine (album), an album by Rosie Thomas
 These Friends of Mine (TV series), the original name of the TV series Ellen, starring Ellen DeGeneres.